Piazza Dante is a mainly semicircular city square in the historic center of the city of Catania, in Sicily, Italy.

The piazza stands in front of the facade of the unfinished San Nicolò l'Arena church. At the rear and sides of the church is the large former Monastery of San Nicolò l'Arena, which now houses the humanities department and library of the University of Catania. Two rectangular expansions flank the semicircle; the southern half contains ruins of the former Ancient Roman Baths of the former Acropolis of the town. The building flanking the semicircle, while somewhat weathered and aged, all sport the identical baroque design, suggesting they were part of an urban plan, likely from the 18th century, when the entire city was rebuilt after the 1693 Sicily earthquake.

References